Khristo Ganchev Markov (born 27 January 1965, in Dimitrovgrad) is a former triple jumper from Bulgaria, best known for becoming Olympic champion in 1988. He also won the European and world championships. Markov was also the coach of compatriot Tereza Marinova (between 1997 and 2008), who won gold in the same discipline at the 2000 Olympics.

Personal bests
 Triple jump - 17.92 (1987)
 Long jump - 8.23
 Pole vault - 5.40 (1994)

References

External links
 
 
 
 

1965 births
Living people
Bulgarian male triple jumpers
Athletes (track and field) at the 1988 Summer Olympics
Athletes (track and field) at the 1992 Summer Olympics
Olympic athletes of Bulgaria
Olympic gold medalists for Bulgaria
People from Dimitrovgrad, Bulgaria
World Athletics Championships athletes for Bulgaria
World Athletics Championships medalists
European Athletics Championships medalists
Medalists at the 1988 Summer Olympics
Olympic gold medalists in athletics (track and field)
Goodwill Games medalists in athletics
Bulgarian expatriates in Qatar
Members of the National Assembly (Bulgaria)
World Athletics Indoor Championships winners
World Athletics Championships winners
Competitors at the 1986 Goodwill Games
Friendship Games medalists in athletics